Durell Taylor is a former American football player who played two seasons in the Arena Football League with the Denver Dynamite and Chicago Bruisers.

References

External links
Just Sports Stats

Living people
Year of birth missing (living people)
American football wide receivers
American football defensive backs
Seattle Seahawks players
Denver Dynamite (arena football) players
Chicago Bruisers players
National Football League replacement players